Patricia Dainton (born 12 April 1930) is a Scottish actress who appeared in a number of film and television roles between 1947 and 1961.

Early years
Dainton was born Margaret Bryden  Pate, in Hamilton, Scotland, the daughter of film and stage agent Vivienne Black. She left Scotland at age ten, moving to London. She attended the Italia Conti Academy of Theatre Arts in London and the Cone school of dance.

Stage
After her stage debut at Stratford-upon-Avon, Dainton acted in the suburbs of London, with roles in Babette, Watch on the Rhine, Quiet Wedding, and A Midsummer Night's Dream.

Film
Dainton's "dancing and acting debut in Technicolor" came in The Dancing Years, with her screen debut in the 1947 film Dancing with Crime. She trained at the Rank Organisation's "charm school". (Another source says that Dainton "made her first film debut in 1942 in The Bells Go Down.")  Her twin brother, George Bryden also made a couple of film and stage appearances around this time. 

As well as appearing in over a dozen film roles, Dainton starred in ITV's Sixpenny Corner, the UK's first daily soap. She appeared in 179 episodes between 1955 and 1956.

Dainton was married to the actor turned producer Norman Williams and they had four children.

In the autobiography of writer Robert Corfe, 'This Was My England', especially in Chapter 14 'My Love for an Actress', Corfe describes his teenage obsession with Dainton which led to gestures of suicide and murder.

55 years after her last film role, she appeared in the public eye again, both attending the Renown Film Festival and providing introductions to her films in "An Afternoon with Patricia Dainton" on her 86th Birthday for TalkingPictures TV.

Selected filmography

 Dancing with Crime (1947)
 Love in Waiting (1948)
 Castle in the Air (1952)
 Hammer the Toff (1952)
 Paul Temple Returns (1952)
 Tread Softly (1952)
 Operation Diplomat (1953)
 No Road Back (1957)
 The Passionate Stranger (1957)
 At the Stroke of Nine (1957)
 Witness in the Dark (1959)
 The House in Marsh Road (1960) (Renamed 'Invisible Creature' on US tv)
 The Third Alibi (1961)
 Ticket to Paradise (1961)

References

External links

1930 births
Living people
Scottish film actresses
Scottish television actresses
People from Hamilton, South Lanarkshire
Alumni of the Italia Conti Academy of Theatre Arts
Anglo-Scots